Yeh Ming-hsun (25September 191321November 2009), was a Chinese journalist and newspaper editor. A native of Fujian Province on the Chinese mainland, he became president of Chunghwa Daily, a newspaper belonging to the ruling Kuomintang, in 1950. In the late 1950s, Cheng Shewo and Yeh co-founded the Shih Hsin School of Journalism (now Shih Hsin University). Yeh served as the school's vice president in 1966 and its chairman from 1991 to 2006.

Yeh died in Taiwan on 21November 2009. At his funeral, President Ma Ying-jeou presented a state citation.

References 

Republic of China journalists
Taiwanese journalists
1913 births
2009 deaths
People from Nanping
Writers from Fujian
Academic staff of Shih Hsin University
Taiwanese people from Fujian
20th-century journalists